The  was a stable of sumo wrestlers, part of the Dewanoumi ichimon or group of stables. Its last head coach, former ōzeki Masuiyama Daishirō II who took charge in November 1984, was the son of the previous head, also an ōzeki under the name Masuiyama Daishirō. He produced nine sekitori in that time, the last being the Russian Aran in July 2008. Until September 2006 the stable also had Baruto in the top division, but he later moved to a newly formed stable, Onoe. Being close to the mandatory retirement age, Mihogaseki wound his stable up in October 2013, with himself and his remaining wrestlers moving to Kasugano stable. Aran chose to retire instead.

Owners
1950-1984: 9th Mihogaseki former ōzeki Masuiyama Daishirō I
1984-2013: 10th Mihogaseki former ōzeki Masuiyama Daishirō II

Notable wrestlers
Kitanoumi, the 55th Yokozuna
Masuiyama Daishiro II, former ōzeki
Hokuten'yū, former ōzeki
Baruto, former ōzeki
Aran, former sekiwake
Hamanoshima Keishi, former komusubi

Coaches
Kiyomigata (former maegashira Dairyugawa)
Matsuchiyama (former komusubi Banryūyama)

Referees
Akijiro Kimura (real name Shigehiro Nakazawa) - jūryō referee

Usher
Takuro (Takuro Hanazato) - junior chief usher
Jiro (Kazuo Nishide) - ''san'yaku usher

See also
List of sumo stables
List of active sumo wrestlers
List of past sumo wrestlers
Glossary of sumo terms

References

External links
Official website
Mihogaseki stable at the Japan Sumo Association
Article on Mihogaseki stable

Defunct sumo stables